Choroszcz is a town in north-eastern Poland, located in Białystok County, Podlaskie Voivodeship, seat of Gmina Choroszcz.

The Baroque palace in Choroszcz was the summer residence of the noble Branicki family, and is now part of the Museum of Polish Interiors. As of December 2021, the town has a population of 5,960.

History

Choroszcz was granted town rights by King Sigismund I the Old in 1507. It was a private town, administratively located in the Podlaskie Voivodeship in the Lesser Poland Province. Jan Klemens Branicki erected a Baroque palace, which served as the summer residence of the Branicki family. Following the Third Partition of Poland, in 1795, it was annexed by Prussia. In 1807, it passed to the Russian Partition of Poland. Choroszcz was one of the sites of Russian executions of Polish insurgents during the January Uprising. The execution sites are now marked by memorials. Following World War I, Poland regained independence and control of the town.

In 1930, a psychiatric hospital was established in the town.

Following the joint German-Soviet invasion of Poland, which started World War II in September 1939, the town was first occupied by the Soviet Union until 1941, and then by Germany until 1944. In 1940, the Russians closed the psychiatric hospital and deported some patients to the Soviet Union, while others were relocated to the local rectory. In 1941, the Germans massacred several hundred remaining patients of the psychiatric hospital in today's Nowosiółki district as part of Aktion T4.

After the war, it was administratively located in the "large" Białystok Voivodeship until 1975, and then the "small" Białystok Voivodeship until 1998.

Demographics 

Detailed data as of 31 December 2021:

Choroszcz had 827 Jewish residents in 1897, and 450 in 1921. Nearly all were murdered in the Holocaust by the Germans during the Second World War.

Number of inhabitants by year

Transport 
Roads in Choroszcz:
  Helsinki – Kaunas – Warsaw – Praga,
  Kudowa-Zdrój - Wrocław - Warsaw - Białystok - Suwałki - Budzisko,

Planned roads:
  - Białystok ring road

Local transportation
For Choroszcz Take Bus 103 from the center of Białystok. Choroszcz is located 6 km from the borders of Bialystok.
Cost of ticket: 
  -reduced (for students) 
     -1 zone : 1,40pln  | ~0,35 €
     -2 zone : 1,20pln  | ~0,30 €
     - 1+2   : 2,60pln  | ~0,75 €
  -normally 
     -1 zone : 2,80pln  | ~0,65 €
     -2 zone : 2,40pln  | ~0,60 €
     - 1+2   : 5,20pln  | ~1,25 €

 Zone 1 - Białystok
 Zone 2 - Municipality Choroszcz

Education 

 Kindergarten of Pope John Paul II
 Primary school of Henryk Sienkiewicz
 Public high school

Sport 
The football club in Choroszcz it Narew Choroszcz occurring in the competition organized by the Podlaski Football Association - is the current Senior Class in the District. There are 3 teams that occur every day in the municipal league competitions: LZS Choroszcz, Choroszcz Rajkom and Lambada.

The main streets 
 PL:Branickiego
 PL:Lipowa
 PL:Powstania Styczniowego EN - January Uprising
 PL:Henryka Sienkiewicza
 PL:Adam Mickiewicza
 PL:Aleja Niepodległości  EN - Independence avenue
 PL:Ogrodowa
 PL:Dominikańska

Streets in Choroszcz

References

External links 
Polish Culture: Museum of Polish Interiors
Museum of Palace Insteriors in Choroszcz (in Polish)

Cities and towns in Podlaskie Voivodeship
Białystok County
Podlachian Voivodeship
Belostoksky Uyezd
Białystok Voivodeship (1919–1939)
Nazi war crimes in Poland
Palaces in Poland